Vakzaĺnaja is a Minsk Metro station. It was opened on 6 November, 2020. The station is located at the intersection of Družnaja and Vakzaĺnaja streets near the main railway station of the city: Minsk Passazhirsky.

It is a transfer station to the Ploshcha Lyenina station on the Maskoŭskaja line.

Gallery

References

Minsk Metro stations
Railway stations opened in 2020